Napomuceno's Will ("The Will of Mr. Napumoceno") is a 1997 Cape Verdean drama film directed by Francisco Manso, based on the 1989 novel The Last Will and Testament of Senhor da Silva Araújo by Germano Almeida.

Synopsis

Napumoceno da Silva Araújo, a wealthy Cape Verde merchant, dies and unexpectedly disinherits his nephew, leaving his fortune to an illegitimate daughter. He also leaves her a collection of cassette tapes in which he tells her the story of his life, how he came from poverty to success and status, and the many women he loved along the way.

Cast

 Nelson Xavier —  Napumoceno da da Silva Araújo
 Maria Ceiça — Graça
 Chico Díaz — Carlos 
 Zezé Motta — Eduarda  
 Vya Negromonte — Mari Chica
 Milton Gonçalves — Mayor
 Elisa Lucinda — Dona Jóia
 Ana Firmino — Dona Rosa
Cesária Évora — Arminda

Release
Napomuceno's Will premiered at the Festival de Gramado, Brazil in August 1997.

It received positive reviews, Variety praising Chico Díaz in particular. For the San Francisco Chronicle, Mick LaSalle wrote that "[Xavier's] Araujo is essentially a clown, but one so dynamic and single-minded that it becomes understandable why he is attractive to women and successful in business. With a virtuosity reminiscent of Roberto Benigni, he uses his voice as a dazzling comedic instrument, rising to ear-splitting heights in moments of pomposity and exasperation. At the same time, Xavier gives us moments of heartbreaking nakedness, when Araujo's pretense drops away, and we see right into his pain."

In Contemporary Lusophone African Film, Paulo de Medeiros complained that the film ignored mentions of colonialism in the original book, pointing out that with a Portuguese director and audience, the film embraces a "Lusotropicalist" perspective or aims to forget about colonialism.

References

External links
 

1997 drama films
Cape Verdean drama films
1990s Portuguese-language films
Films set in Cape Verde
Films directed by Francisco Manso